The Holy Roman Empire was a highly decentralized state for most of its history, composed of hundreds of smaller states, most of which operated with some degree of independent sovereignty. Although in the earlier part of the Middle Ages, under the Salian and Hohenstaufen emperors, it was relatively centralized, as time went on the Emperor lost more and more power to the Princes. The membership of the Imperial Diet in 1792, late in the Empire's history but before the beginning of the French Revolutionary Wars, gives some insight as to the composition of the Holy Roman Empire at that time.

Structure of the Diet of the Holy Roman Empire in 1792
The year 1792 was just before the vast changes inspired by the French Revolutionary incursions into Germany. The empire was, at that time, divided into several thousand immediate (unmittelbar) territories, but only about three hundred of these had Landeshoheit (the special sort of quasi-sovereignty enjoyed by the states of the Empire), and had representation in the Imperial Diet of the Holy Roman Empire (German Reichstag). The Imperial Diet was divided into three so-called collegia—the Council of Electors, the Council of Princes, and the Council of Cities. As those who received votes had gradually changed over the centuries, many princes held more than one vote. Certain territories which had once held votes in the Diet, as for instance the County of Waldeck or the Duchy of Jülich-Kleve-Berg, no longer retained them, due to the extinction of a dynasty or other causes.

The Council of Electors
The council included the following eight members:
 The King of Bohemia (also Archduke of Austria and King of Hungary) (Emperor Leopold II)
 The Archbishop of Mainz ( Frederick Charles Joseph of Erthal)
 The Archbishop of Trier (Clement Wenceslaus of Saxony)
 The Archbishop of Cologne (Maximilian Francis of Austria)
 The Count Palatine of the Rhine (also Duke of Bavaria) (Charles IV Theodore)
 The Duke of Saxony (Frederick Augustus III)
 The Margrave of Brandenburg (King of Prussia) (Frederick William II)
 The Duke of Brunswick-Lüneburg (Elector of Hanover, King of Great Britain) (George III)

The Council of Princes
This is ordered based on the official order of voting in the Diet:
 The Archduke of Austria (also King of Bohemia) (Emperor Leopold II)
 The Duke of Burgundy (also Archduke of Austria) (Emperor Leopold II)

The Ecclesiastical Bench
 The Archbishop of Salzburg (Hieronymus von Colloredo)
 The Archbishop of Besançon (vacant seat)
 The Grand Master of the Teutonic Order (Maximilian Franz of Austria, the Elector of Cologne)
 The Bishop of Bamberg (Franz Ludwig von Erthal, also Prince-Bishop of Würzburg)
 The Bishop of Würzburg (Franz Ludwig von Erthal, also Prince-Bishop of Bamberg)
 The Bishop of Worms (Friedrich Karl Joseph von Erthal, the Elector of Mainz)
 The Bishop of Eichstätt (Joseph von Stubenberg)
 The Bishop of Speyer (August Philip of Limburg Stirum)
 The Bishop of Strassburg (Louis-René-Edouard de Rohan-Guéménée)
 The Bishop of Constance (Maximilian Christof von Rodt)
 The Bishop of Augsburg (Clemens Wenzeslaus of Saxony, the Elector of Trier)
 The Bishop of Hildesheim (Franz Egon von Fürstenberg, also Prince-Bishop of Paderborn)
 The Bishop of Paderborn (Franz Egon von Fürstenberg, also Prince-Bishop of Hildesheim)
 The Bishop of Freising (Joseph Konrad von Schroffenberg-Mös, also Prince-Bishop of Regensburg)
 The Bishop of Regensburg (Joseph Konrad von Schroffenberg-Mös, also Prince-Bishop of Freising)
 The Bishop of Passau (Joseph Franz Anton von Auersperg)
 The Bishop of Trent (Peter Michael Vigilius von Thun-Hohenstein)
 The Bishop of Brixen (Karl Franz von Lodron)
 The Bishop of Basel (Franz Joseph Sigismund von Roggenbach)
 The Bishop of Münster (Maximilian Francis of Austria, the Elector of Cologne)
 The Bishop of Osnabrück (notable as, after 1648, it alternated between Protestant and Roman Catholic incumbents) (Frederick Augustus of Brunswick-Lüneburg)
 The Bishop of Liège (Prince-Bishop César-Constantin-François de Hoensbroeck)
 The Bishop of Lübeck (a Protestant bishopric) (Peter Friedrich Ludwig of Holstein-Gottorp)
 The Bishop of Chur (Franz Dionysius von Rost)
 The Bishop of Fulda (Adalbert von Harstall)
 The Abbot of Kempten (Ruprecht von Neuenstein)
 The Provost of Ellwangen (Clemens Wenzeslaus of Saxony, the Elector of Trier)
 The Grand Master of the Order of St. John (Emmanuel de Rohan-Polduc)
 The Provost of Berchtesgaden (Joseph Konrad von Schroffenberg-Mös, the Prince-Bishop of Freising and Regensburg)
 The Provost of Weissenburg (August Philip of Limburg Stirum, the Prince-Bishop of Speyer)
 The Abbot of Prüm (Clemens Wenzeslaus of Saxony, the Elector of Trier)
 The Abbot of Stablo (Célestin Thys)
 The Abbot of Corvey (Theodor von Brabeck)
 A single vote for the College of the Prelates of Swabia; see below A single vote for the College of the Prelates of the Rhine; see belowThese last two were groups of lesser abbots, who together had a joint vote. Unlike those who had a full vote, they were not considered fully sovereign.

The Secular Bench
 The Duke of Bavaria (Charles Theodore, also Elector Palatine)
 The Duke of Magdeburg (Frederick William II, also King of Prussia)
 The Count Palatine of Kaiserslautern (Charles Theodore, also Elector Palatine)
 The Count Palatine of Simmern (Charles Theodore, also Elector Palatine)
 The Count Palatine of Neuburg (Charles Theodore, also Elector Palatine)
 The Duke of Bremen (George III, also King of Great Britain and Ireland and Elector of Hanover)
 The Duke of Zweibrücken (Carl II August)
 The Count Palatine of Veldenz (Charles Theodore, also Elector Palatine)
 The Duke of Saxe-Weimar (Carl August, also Duke of Saxe-Eisenach)
 The Duke of Saxe-Eisenach (Carl August, also Duke of Saxe-Weimar)
 The Duke of Saxe-Coburg (two branches of the Wettin family split this vote:
 Ernest Frederick of Saxe-Coburg-Saalfeld
 George I of Saxe-Meiningen)
 The Duke of Saxe-Gotha (Ernest II, also Duke of Saxe-Altenburg)
 The Duke of Saxe-Altenburg (Ernest II, also Duke of Saxe-Gotha)
 The Margrave of Brandenburg-Ansbach (Frederick William II, also King of Prussia)
 The Margrave of Brandenburg-Bayreuth (Frederick William II, also King of Prussia)
 The Duke of Brunswick-Celle (George III, also King of Great Britain and Ireland and Elector of Hanover)
 The Duke of Brunswick-Kalenberg (George III, also King of Great Britain and Ireland and Elector of Hanover)
 The Duke of Brunswick-Grubenhagen (George III, also King of Great Britain and Ireland and Elector of Hanover)
 The Duke of Brunswick-Wolfenbüttel (Charles William Ferdinand)
 The Prince of Halberstadt (Frederick William II, also King of Prussia)
 The Duke of Farther Pomerania (Frederick William II, also King of Prussia)
 The Duke of Upper Pomerania (Gustav III, also King of Sweden)
 The Prince of Verden (George III, also King of Great Britain and Ireland and Elector of Hanover)
 The Duke of Mecklenburg-Schwerin (Frederick Francis I)
 The Duke of Mecklenburg-Güstrow (Frederick Francis I, also Duke of Mecklenburg-Schwerin)
 The Duke of Württemberg (Karl Eugen)
 The Landgrave of Hesse-Kassel (or Hesse-Cassel) (William IX)
 The Landgrave of Hesse-Darmstadt (Louis X)
 The Margrave of Baden-Baden (Charles Frederick, Margrave of Baden)
 The Margrave of Baden-Durlach (Charles Frederick, Margrave of Baden)
 The Margrave of Baden-Hachberg (Charles Frederick, Margrave of Baden)
 The Duke of Holstein (Christian VII, also King of Denmark)
 The Duke of Saxe-Lauenburg (George III, also King of Great Britain and Ireland and Elector of Hanover)
 The Prince of Minden (Frederick William II, also King of Prussia)
 The Duke of Holstein-Gottorp-Oldenburg (Peter Frederick William)
 The Duke of Savoy (Victor Amadeus III, also King of Sardinia)
 The Landgrave of Leuchtenberg (Charles Theodore, also Elector Palatine)
 The Prince of Anhalt (4 branches split the vote -
 Frederick Augustus of Anhalt-Zerbst
 Leopold III of Anhalt-Dessau
 Fredrick Albert of Anhalt-Bernburg
 August Christian of Anhalt-Köthen)
 The Princely Count of Henneberg (this vote was divided among the various branches of the House of Wettin—
 Frederick Augustus III of the Electorate of Saxony
 Carl August of Saxe-Weimar-Eisenach
 Ernest II of Saxe-Gotha-Altenburg
 George I of Saxe-Meiningen
 Frederick of Saxe-Hildburghausen
 Ernst Friedrich of Saxe-Coburg-Saalfeld)
 The Prince of Schwerin (Frederick Francis I, also Duke of Mecklenburg-Schwerin)
 The Prince of Kammin (Frederick William II, also King of Prussia)
 The Prince of Ratzeburg (Adolphus Frederick IV, also Duke of Mecklenburg-Strelitz)
 The Prince of Hersfeld (William IX, also Landgrave of Hesse-Kassel)
 The Prince of Nomény (to the House of Lorraine; Emperor Leopold II, also King of Bohemia, etc.)
 The Prince of Mömpelgard (Montbéliard) (Charles Eugene, also Duke of Württemberg)
 The Duke of Arenberg (Louis Engelbert)
 The Prince of Hohenzollern-Hechingen (Josef Friedrich Wilhelm)
 The Prince of Lobkowitz (Joseph Franz Maximilian)
 The Prince of Salm (there were two branches of this family, who split the vote:
 Constantin Alexander of Salm-Salm (de)
 Frederick III of Salm-Kyrburg)
 The Prince of Dietrichstein-Tarasp (Karl Johann)
 The Prince of Nassau-Hadamar (William V, also Prince of Orange and Stadtholder of the United Provinces)
 The Prince of Nassau-Dillenburg (William V, also Prince of Orange and Stadtholder of the United Provinces)
 The Prince of Auersperg (Karl Josef Anton)
 The Prince of East Frisia (Frederick William II, also King of Prussia)
 The Prince of Fürstenberg (Joseph Maria Benedict) (de)
 The Prince of Schwarzenberg (Joseph II)
 The Prince of Liechtenstein (Aloys I)
 The Prince of Thurn und Taxis (Karl Anselm)
 The Prince of Schwarzburg (there were two branches of this family, who split the vote -
 Christian Günther III of Schwarzburg-Sondershausen
 Frederick Charles of Schwarzburg-Rudolstadt)
 A single vote for the College of the Counts of Swabia; see below A single vote for the College of the Counts of the Wetterau; see below A single vote for the College of the Counts of Franconia; see below A single vote for the College of the Counts of Westphalia; see below''

The Council of Cities
The Council of Imperial Free Cities was theoretically equal to the others, but in actuality it was never allowed to cast a deciding vote and in practice its vote was only advisory.  In 1792, there were 51 Free Cities, divided amongst two benches.

Rhenish Bench
 Cologne
 Aachen
 Lübeck
 Worms
 Speyer
 Frankfurt am Main
 Goslar
 Bremen
 Hamburg
 Mühlhausen
 Nordhausen
 Dortmund
 Friedberg
 Wetzlar

Swabian Bench
 Regensburg
 Augsburg
 Nuremberg
 Ulm
 Esslingen am Neckar
 Reutlingen
 Nördlingen
 Rothenburg ob der Tauber
 Schwäbisch Hall
 Rottweil
 Überlingen
 Heilbronn
 Schwäbisch Gmünd
 Memmingen
 Lindau
 Dinkelsbühl
 Biberach
 Ravensburg
 Schweinfurt
 Kempten
 Windsheim
 Kaufbeuren
 Weil
 Wangen
 Isny
 Pfullendorf
 Offenburg
 Leutkirch
 Wimpfen
 Weißenburg im Nordgau
 Giengen
 Gengenbach
 Zell am Harmersbach
 Buchhorn
 Aalen
 Buchau
 Bopfingen

Membership of single-vote colleges
The two benches of the Council of Princes each contained single-vote colleges. The membership of each of these was as follows:

The Prelates of Swabia
 The Abbess of Baindt
 The Abbot of Elchingen
 The Abbot of Gengenbach
 The Abbess of Gutenzell
 The Abbess of Heggbach
 The Abbess of Irsee
 The Abbot of Kaisheim
 The Abbot of Marchtal
 The Abbot of Neresheim
 The Abbot of Ochsenhausen
 The Abbot of Petershausen
 The Abbot of Roggenburg
 The Abbot of Rot
 The Abbot of Rottenmünster
 The Abbot of Salmannsweiler
 The Abbot of Schussenried
 The Abbess of Söflingen
 The Abbot of Ursperg
 The Abbot of Weingarten
 The Abbot of Weissenau
 The Abbot of Wettenhausen
 The Abbot of Zwiefalten

The Prelates of the Rhine
 The Abbot of Bruchsal and Odenheim
 The Abbess of Buchau
 The Abbot of Burtscheid
 The Abbot of Ballei of Koblenz (Grand Master of the Teutonic Order)
 The Abbot of St. Cornelismünster
 The Abbot of Ballei of Elsass and Burgundy (Grand Master of the Teutonic Order)
 The Abbess of Essen
 The Abbess of Gandersheim
 The Abbot of St Georg in Isny
 The Abbess of Gernrode
 The Abbess of Herford
 The Abbess of Niedermünster in Regensburg
 The Abbess of Obermünster in Regensburg
 The Abbess of Quedlinburg
 The Abbess of Thorn
 The Abbot of St. Ulrich and St. Afra in Augsburg
 The Abbot of Werden

The Counts of the Wetterau
 The Princes and Counts of Solms
 The Prince of Nassau-Usingen
 The Prince of Nassau-Weilburg
 The Prince of Nassau-Saarbrücken
 The Princes and Counts of Isenburg
 The Counts of Stolberg
 The Princes and Counts of Sayn-Wittgenstein
 The Counts of Salm
 The Princes and Counts of Leiningen
 The Counts of Westerburg
 The Counts of Wetter-Tegerfelden
 The Counts of Hoyos
 The Counts of Schönburg
 The Count of Wied-Runkel
 The Counts of Ortenburg
 The Counts of Reuss zu Plauen

The Counts of Swabia
 The Prince of Fürstenberg
 The Abbess of Buchau (in possession of the Lordship of Straßberg)
 The Commander of the Teutonic Knights
 The Prince of Oettingen
 The Count of Montfort (also King of Bohemia)
 The Count of Helfenstein (also Elector of Bavaria)
 The Prince of Schwarzenberg
 The Count of Königsegg
 The Count of Waldburg
 The Count of Eberstein (also Margrave of Baden)
 The Count von der Leyen
 The Counts of Fugger
 The Lord of Hohenems (also King of Bohemia)
 The Prince-Abbot of St. Blase (in possession of the County of Bonndorf)
 The Count of Pappenheim
 The Count of Stadion
 The Count of Traun
 The Prince of Thurn und Taxis
 the Count of Wetter-Tegerfelden in Bonndorf
 The Count of Khevenhüller
 The Count of Kuefstein
 The Prince of Colloredo
 The Count of Harrach
 The Count of Sternberg
 The Count of Neipperg

The Counts of Franconia
 The Princes and Counts of Hohenlohe
 The Counts of Castell
 The Counts of Erbach
 The Counts of Rothenberg  (later the Counts of Rothberg)
 The Princes and Counts of Löwenstein-Wertheim
 The Heirs to the Counts of Limpurg
 The Counts of Nostitz-Rieneck
 The Prince of Schwarzenberg
 The Heirs to the Counts of Wolfstein
 The Counts of Schönborn
 The Counts of Windisch-Grätz
 The Counts Orsini von Rosenberg
 The Counts of Starhemberg
 The Counts of Wurmbrand
 The Counts of Giech
 The Counts of Gravenitz
 The Counts of Pückler

The Counts of Westphalia
 The Lord of Sayn-Altenkirchen (also King of Prussia)
 The Count of Hoya (also Elector of Hanover)
 The Count of Spiegelberg (also Elector of Hanover)
 The Count of Diepholz (also Elector of Hanover)
 The Duke of Holstein-Gottorp
 The Count of Tecklenburg (also King of Prussia)
 The Duke of Arenberg
 The Prince of Wied-Runkel
 The Prince of Wied-Neuwied
 The Count of Schaumburg (shared between the Landgrave of Hesse-Kassel and the Count of Lippe-Bückeburg)
 The Counts of Lippe
 The Counts of Bentheim
 The Princes and Counts of Löwenstein-Wertheim
 The Prince of Kaunitz-Rietberg
 The Prince of Waldeck and Pyrmont
 The Count of Toerring
 The Count of Aspremont
 The Prince of Salm-Salm (as Count of Anholt)
 The Count of Metternich-Winnenburg
 The Prince of Anhalt-Bernburg-Schaumburg
 The Counts of Plettenberg
 The Counts of Limburg-Stirum
 The Count of Wallmoden
 The Count of Quadt
 The Counts of Ostein
 The Counts of Nesselrode
 The Counts of Salm-Reifferscheidt
 The Counts of Platen
 The Counts of Sinzendorf
 The Prince of Ligne

See also
 List of states in the Holy Roman Empire

Notes

Sources
 Val Rozn, "The Secular Voices in the Council of Princes (Fürstenrat) of the Imperial Assembly (Reichstag) in 1582" (1999–2009)
 G. Oestreich und E. Holzer, 'Übersicht über die Reichsstände'. in Bruno Gebhardt: Handbuch der Deutschen Geschichte. 9. Auflage, Bd. 2. Ernst Ketler Verlag, Stuttgart. 1973. pp. 769–784.

Imperial
Holy Roman Empire-related lists
Germany history-related lists
1792
Lists of political office-holders in Germany
1792 in the Holy Roman Empire
1792 in politics